Trinity Hall may refer to:

 Trinity Hall, Cambridge, a constituent college of the University of Cambridge
 Trinity Hall, Dublin, a hall of residence of Trinity College Dublin
 Trinity Hall (New Jersey), high school in Tinton Falls, New Jersey
 Trinity Hall, a historic building within the campus of Trinity High School in Washington, Pennsylvania

See also 

Trinity College (disambiguation)

 fr:Trinity Hall